Robert Stewart (April 7, 1850 – April 10, 1925) was a Canadian politician.

He was born in Ottawa, Ontario, the son of William Stewart and Sarah Jane Donaldson, migrants from Northern Ireland. Stewart was educated in Ottawa's public school system along with his brothers, J.K., William and Samuel, and continued to take an active interest in the school system's development throughout his life. An insurance and general agent with his firm R. Stewart & Son, he was an alderman on the Ottawa City Council, where he was said to have "represented the city's monied classes," and was president and treasurer of the YMCA. He was elected to the House of Commons of Canada as the Liberal member for Ottawa in the 1904 federal election that returned a third straight majority for Liberal Prime Minister Sir Wilfrid Laurier. He resigned the riding in 1908 shortly before that year's general election.

In 1877, Stewart married Mary Louisa Howard Sharp. He died in Ottawa at the age of 75.

He is unrelated to the formerly prominent Ottawa family of William Stewart, who owned a large portion of The Glebe and who was father of Ottawa mayor McLeod Stewart, a contemporary of Robert on the Ottawa City Council.

References

External links
 

1850 births
1925 deaths
Canadian people of Irish descent
Liberal Party of Canada MPs
Members of the House of Commons of Canada from Ontario
Ottawa city councillors
YMCA leaders